Valskog is a locality situated in Kungsör Municipality, Västmanland County, Sweden with 694 inhabitants in 2010.

References 

Populated places in Västmanland County
Populated places in Kungsör Municipality